Tell el-Hesi, or Tell el-Hesy, is a 25-acre archaeological site in Israel. It was the first major site excavated in Palestine, first by Flinders Petrie in 1890 and later by Frederick Jones Bliss in 1891 and 1892, both sponsored by the Palestine Exploration Fund (PEF). Petrie's excavations were one of the first to systematically use stratigraphy and seriation to produce a chronology of the site. 
Tell el-Hesi is located southwest of the modern Israeli city of Qiryat Gat.

History
The site was occupied from the Pre-Pottery Neolithic period to the Hellenistic period, though not continuously.

Early Bronze IIIA
Settlement seems to have started at the beginning of the EB IIIA or earlier. Radiocarbon dating of emmer samples calibrated to 2890-2590 and 2900-2620 BC. By the late EB IIIA the fortified city that reached a size of 25 acres/10.1 ha. It was located along the Wadi el-Hesi which was a stream at the time. The economy was based on animal husbandry (cattle herding) and grain production, at it may have been a center for trade. There were workshops for incised bone tubes.

Later occupation
It then fell into disuse until the middle of the 2nd millennium during the Late Bronze Age when it
was rebuilt, staying in use for around a thousand years.

A military trench system was dug into the top of the mound
during the 1948 Arab–Israeli War.

Speculations about city name
Petrie identified Tell el-Hesi as the Biblical site of Lachish, and Bliss accepted this identification, but it is no longer accepted. In 1924 William F. Albright proposed that Tell el-Hesi was Biblical Eglon, an identification still accepted by Yohanan Aharoni in the 1970s.  This identification, too, is unlikely and the site should be considered unidentified.

Archaeology

The site was first described in 1838 by Edward Robinson. It is 200 feet above the land in the East and 60 feet high in the other directions. The mound was roughly square with 200 feet on a side in Robinson's time but has been reduced by
excavations and military action.

It was originally excavated between 1890 and 1892 by the PEF during five excavation seasons. The first season was under Petrie. After brief training under Petrie at Meydum in Egypt, Bliss began four seasons of work at Tell el-Hesi. Using Petrie's ceramic sequence and the pioneering concept of a sequence of 'cities', Bliss was able to establish not only the archaeology of this specific site, but the sequential framework for Levantine archaeology. The final reports were published in 1891 and 1894. Among other discoveries was the remains of what was identified as a blast furnace, with slag and ashes, which was dated to 1500 BC. If the theories of experts are correct, the use of the hot-air blast instead of cold air was known at an extremely early age. Aside from some inscribed pottery of 
various periods, the significant epigraphic find was a single
cuneiform tablet. This tablet is closely related to the Amarna Letters and mentions a person noted as the governor of Lachish in those letters.

A second series of excavations began in 1970, at the behest of the American Schools of Oriental Research and its President G. Ernest Wright, the Joint Archaeological Expedition to Tell el-Hesi. The original core staff of directors for the project included John Worrell - Director; Lawrence Toombs - Senior Archeologist, Phillip King - Administrative Director, Tom Frank - Education Director, and W. J. Bennett Jr. and Lawrence Stager as Field Directors. The team excavated at the site from 1970 to 1983 for eight summer seasons. The project emphasized excavation in two parts of the site: the acropolis and its associated wall system (Fields I and III), and the Early Bronze III (EB III) wall system of the lower city (Fields V, VI, and IX).

See also
Cities of the ancient Near East

References

Bibliography

 (pp. 261290-291)

   (p. 296 )
 (p. 379)

Geoffrey E. Ludvik, Jeffrey A. Blakely. (2020) The Early Bronze Age of Tell el-Hesi and its environs: From Petrie’s initial discovery to today’s understanding. Palestine Exploration Quarterly 152:4, pages 304-331.
Kara Larson, James W. Hardin, Sara Cody. (2020) Cultural Modification Analyses on Faunal Remains in Relation to Space Use and Direct Provisioning from Field VI EBIIIA Tell el-Hesi. Palestine Exploration Quarterly 152:4, pages 365-388.

External links
The Tell el-Hesi Joint Archaeological Project
Survey of Western Palestine, Map 20:   IAA, Wikimedia commons

Ancient Israel and Judah
Former populated places in Southwest Asia
Ancient sites in Israel
Bronze Age sites in Israel
Iron Age sites in Israel